Queen's, also known as Queen's Glass Slipper, is a 2007 Taiwanese romantic comedy television series starring Tang Zhen Gang and Joelle Lu. It started to air on March 3, 2007. It is based on the Korean comic series Queen's (퀸즈) by Ha Sung-Hyen (하성현).

Synopsis
Tie Xiong has been in love with his best friend Cai Ke Er since the first day he set eyes on her. Cai Ke Er is a girl with an obsession with Anime and Manga and also dreams of designing costumes for Cosplay. In hopes of winning Ke Er's heart, Tie Xiong becomes what he thinks is Ke Er's ideal man... cute, friendly, good at cooking and sewing, not to mention... Ke Er's cross-dressing cosplay model code-named "Saber"!

But who would have known that what Ke Er really wanted wasn't a cute and cuddly at all... but an athletic, sweaty, ill-tempered basketball player, Jin Yong Jun.
Tie Xiong, being somewhat devastated, sets out to become all and more of what Ke Er wants... and finds some added help when he picks up a comic book titled: "The Real Man".

Cast
 Tang Zhen Gang as Tie Xiong 
 Joelle Lu as Lin Fu Nan 
 Amanda Cou as Cai Ke Er 
 Andy Gong as Jin Yong Jun 
 Shatina Chen as Sun Ya Ying 
 Michael Zhang as Zhuang Ren He 
 Renzo Liu as Tie Xiong's father 
 Lin Mei-hsiu as Tie Xiong's mother 
 Gina Lin as Tie Xiong's eldest sister
 Wei Ru (as Tie Xiong's second sister 
 Shen Dong Jing as Wu Rong En 
 Liu Er Jin as School Dean 
 Weber Yang as General manager secretary (cameo)

References

External links
 Official CTS Site
 Official GTV Site

Taiwanese drama television series
Chinese Television System original programming
Gala Television original programming
2008 Taiwanese television series debuts
Television shows based on manhwa